Norbert Hrnčár (born 9 June 1970) is a former Slovak football player and a current manager of Zemplín Michalovce.

Playing career
Hrnčár spent two seasons in the Slovak top division with FC Nitra, appearing in 32 league matches.

Managerial career
He started his managerial career at Petržalka. In March 2022, Hrnčár replaced Miroslav Nemec as the manager of Zemplín Michalovce.

Personal life
Hrnčár's son, David, is also football player, currently playing for ViOn Zlaté Moravce.

Honours

Player
Slovan Bratislava
Slovak Super Liga (1): 1998–99
Slovak Cup (1): 1998–99

References

External links

1970 births
Living people
Association football midfielders
Sportspeople from Nitra
Slovak footballers
Slovakia international footballers
FC Nitra players
FK Dukla Banská Bystrica players
MŠK Žilina players
ŠK Slovan Bratislava players
Slovak Super Liga players
Slovak football managers
FC Petržalka managers
FK Dukla Banská Bystrica managers
Spartak Myjava managers
MFK Ružomberok managers
MFK Karviná managers
AS Trenčín managers
FC Spartak Trnava managers
MFK Zemplín Michalovce managers
Slovak Super Liga managers
Expatriate football managers in the Czech Republic
Slovak expatriate sportspeople in the Czech Republic